North Fenton is a hamlet in New York. It is part of the Town of Fenton, Broome County at the corner of NY-79 and NY-369 by the north town line. It was originally called Ketchums Corners.

References

Hamlets in New York (state)
Hamlets in Broome County, New York